O Přirozenosti Rostlin (On the Nature of Plants) is a Czech botanical text written by Friedrich von Berchtold and Jan Svatopluk Presl, and published in Prague in 1820. A later expanded edition in three volumes was published between 1823 and 1835. The full title of the 1820 work is O přirozenosti Rostlin, obsahugjcj gednánj o žiwobytj rostlin pro sebe a z ohledu giných žiwoků, podlé stawu nyněgssího znanj, pýtwu rostlin; názwoslowj audů; hospodářstwj gegich; rozssjřenj po zemi a způsob rostlinář zřjditi a zachowati (Praha: Krala Wiljma Endersa 1820)  but is generally referred to as O Prirozenosti Rostlin, and the standardised abbreviations is Prir. Rostlin.

The later edition is O přirozenosti rostlin aneb rostlinář, obsahugjcj popsánj a wyobrazenj rostlin podlé řádů přirozených zpořádané, s zewrubným wyznamenánjm wlastnostj, užitečnosti a škodliwosti, obzwlástě wywodin a zlodin, spůsobu wydobýwánj, poslednjch dobroty a porušenosti neygistěgšjho poznánj a zkaušenj, též spůsobu užitecných sázenj chowánj a rozmnožwánj. Ustanowený pro lékaře, hogiče, hospodáře, umělce, řemeslnjky a wychowatele (Praha: Jos. Krause 1823 - 1835, 3 vols.) and is referred to as O Prirozenosti Rostlin aneb rostlinar, and the standardised abbreviations is Prir. Rostlin Aneb. Rostl..

Publication details 
 O Přirozenosti Rostlin 1820
 O Přirozenosti Rostlin aneb rostlinář
 Volume 1, 1820
 Volume 2, 1823–1825
 Volume 3, 1830–1835

References

Bibliography 

 
 
 
 
 
 
 

Botany books
Systems of plant taxonomy